Lucy Hardy-Wainwright (born 5 May 1978) is a British sprint canoer who has competed since the mid-2000s. Competing in two Summer Olympics, she earned her best finish of seventh in the K-1 500 m event twice (2004, 2008).

References
Sports-Reference.com profile

1978 births
Canoeists at the 2004 Summer Olympics
Canoeists at the 2008 Summer Olympics
Living people
Olympic canoeists of Great Britain
British female canoeists